Publius Sextilius was a Roman praetor (92 BC?) and governor of Africa during the civil wars between Sulla and Marius. As governor in 88 BC, he refused Marius and his followers asylum in Africa.

Marius in Africa
Plutarch presents a highly colored version of how Sextilius rejected Marius and furnishes a moral:

Little is known of this Sextilius. It is likely that he belonged to the senatorial family of Sextilii who used the praenomen Publius, among them a 2nd-century B.C. praetor from whom a letter fragment survives. At one time, numismatic evidence was interpreted as referring to Sextilius as praetor and propraetor, but the coin has since been determined to belong to the Augustan period.

Before the arrival of Marius in Africa, Sextilius had taken a neutral position in the civil war. He had allowed some of Marius's allies to join up with Hiempsal II, king of Numidia, who at that time was attempting to gain the confidence of the Marians while acting on behalf of Sulla. If Sextilius had been serious about carrying out his threat to treat Marius as a public enemy — a senatorial decree which sanctioned his execution at sight — he most likely would have allowed Marius to enter the country  rather than warning him off. The difficulty of Sextilius's position is indicated by the consequences of his action: since no further public office for him is known, he evidently pleased neither side in the conflict.

Date of praetorship
Cicero writes of a P. Sextilius Rufus who claimed he was bound by his oath of office to follow the Lex Voconia in depriving a young woman of her inheritance. E. Badian has argued that this was the P. Sextilius who became governor of Africa and dates his praetorship to 92.

Literary interests
There is some indication that Publius Sextilius took an interest in or was a patron of literature. When Cassius Dionysius of Utica translated the great agricultural treatise of the Carthaginian Mago into Greek, he dedicated his translation to Sextilius.

References

1st-century BC Romans
Roman governors of Africa
Roman Republican praetors
Publius